USS Lewis B. Puller (FFG-23) was the fifteenth ship of the  of guided-missile frigates in the United States Navy. She was the first US Navy ship to be named for United States Marine Corps Lieutenant General Lewis B. "Chesty" Puller (1898–1971).  Ordered from Todd Pacific Shipyards, Los Angeles Division, San Pedro, California on 28 February 1977 as part of the FY77 program, Lewis B. Puller was laid down on 23 May 1979, launched on 15 March 1980, and commissioned on 17 April 1982.  Decommissioned and stricken on 18 September 1998, she was transferred to Egypt the same day as Toushka (F906).

See also

References

External links 
MaritimeQuest USS Lewis B. Puller FFG-23 pages
GlobalSecurity.org FFG-23

 

Oliver Hazard Perry-class frigates of the United States Navy
Ships built in Los Angeles
1980 ships
Cold War frigates and destroyer escorts of the United States
Mubarak-class frigates
Frigates of Egypt